Arekmane (Tarifit: Qariya or Arekman, ⵇⴰⵔⵉⵢⴰ / ⴰⵔⴻⴽⵎⴰⵏ; Arabic:  أركمان) is a commune in the Nador Province of the Oriental administrative region of Morocco. At the time of the 2004 census, the commune had a total population of 18998 people living in 3720 households.

References

Populated places in Nador Province
Rural communes of Oriental (Morocco)